Carl Ludwig Christian Rümker (28 May 1788 – 21 December 1862) was a German astronomer.

Early life (1788-1821)
Rümker was born in Burg Stargard, in Mecklenburg, Germany, the son of J. F. Rümker, a court-councillor. He showed an aptitude for mathematics and studied at the Builders' Academy, Berlin, graduating in 1807 as a master builder. Instead of a career in building, he taught mathematics in Hamburg until 1809 when he went to England.

Rümker served as a midshipman in the British East India Company and then in the British merchant navy from 1811 until 1813.  In July 1813 he was seized by a pressgang and joined the Royal Navy. He served in the Royal Navy as a schoolmaster until 1817 on HMS Benbow, Montague and Albion taking part in the expedition to Algiers in 1816 whilst on the Albion.  In 1817 he met Austrian astronomer Baron Franz Xaver von Zach, who influenced Rümker to study astronomy. Rümker was director of the school of navigation at Hamburg from 1819 until 1820.

Life in New South Wales (Australia) (1821-1830)
Rümker was one of a number of influential German-speaking residents  such as William Blandowski, Ludwig Becker, Hermann Beckler, Amalie Dietrich, Diedrich Henne, Gerard Krefft, Johann Luehmann, Johann Menge, Ludwig Preiss, Moritz Richard Schomburgk, Richard Wolfgang Semon, George Ulrich, Eugene von Guérard, Robert von Lendenfeld, Ferdinand von Mueller, Georg von Neumayer, and Carl Wilhelmi  who brought their "epistemic traditions" to Australia, and not only became "deeply entangled with the Australian colonial project", but also "intricately involved in imagining, knowing and shaping colonial Australia" (Barrett, et al., 2018, p.2).

In 1821 Rümker went to New South Wales as astronomer at the observatory built at Parramatta by Sir Thomas Brisbane. James Dunlop was second assistant. Rümker was awarded the silver medal of the Royal Astronomical Society together with £100, for his re-discovery of Comet Encke on 2 June 1822 and also received the gold medal of the Institut de France.

In June 1823 having fallen out with Brisbane he left the observatory. He had been granted  of land on the west side of the Nepean River on the assurance that he would devote his time to scientific pursuits. Brisbane in a dispatch to Henry Bathurst, 3rd Earl Bathurst in November 1823 requested that the grant should not be confirmed beyond  because Rümker had "completely broken" his promise. Bathurst, however, refused Brisbane's request, realizing that this would be a case of one man's word against another's if it were further investigated. After Brisbane's departure Rümker was placed in charge of the observatory by the government in May 1826, Rümker being the first to hold the title of government astronomer. It was intended that Rümker should measure the arc of the meridian; however it would have been necessary to obtain instruments from London and Rümker left the colony in January 1829.

The results of his observations at Parramatta were published in Part III of the Philosophical Transactions of the Royal Society for 1829 and in the Royal Astronomical Society's Memoirs, Vol. III. Rümker also contributed an article to the Geographical Memoirs of New South Wales, edited by Barron Field, the first collection of scientific papers published in Australia. While in England, Rümker quarrelled with James South, president of the Royal Astronomical Society, who dismissed Rümker from British government service.

Life in Hamburg, Germany (1830-1857)
Rümker returned to Europe in 1830 and took charge of the new Hamburg Observatory after the death of Johann Georg Repsold in 1830. His chief work was concerned with the cataloging of stars: a preliminary catalogue of the stars of the Southern Hemisphere was published in 1832 at Hamburg, and from 1846 to 1852 he published his great catalogue of 12,000 stars. He served as the director of Hamburger Sternwarte then located at Stadtwall and funded by the city of Hamburg as Christian Karl Ludwig Rümker from 1833 to 1857.

Final years & Legacy (1857-1862)

In 1857, Rümker resided at Lisbon, Portugal, where he died in 1862. His son was also an astronomer, Georg Friedrich Wilhelm Rümker, who was born in 1832, at Hamburg. He took over as director of Hamburger Sternwarte in 1857, where he served until his death in 1900. The Hamburger Sternwarte at Millerntor site was demolished when the observatory moved to Bergedorf under the direction of Richard Schorr for better astronomical seeing (the telescopes were moved), and the area eventually became the location of the Hamburg Museum. From 1901 to 1922 the new Hamburg observatory at Bergedorf renewed the observation of Rümker's catalog with its 12,000 stars. The catalog Carl Rümkers Hamburger Sternverzeichnis 1845.0 was published in 1923.

The lunar massif Mons Rümker is named for him.

Notable writings
 Preliminary catalogue of fixed stars, etc. (1832)
 Handbuch der Schiffahrtskunde (1857)
 Mittlere Örter von 12.000 Fixsternen (1843–1852, 4 parts; new series 1857, 2 parts)
 Längenbestimmung durch den Mond (1849).

Notes

References
 Barrett, L., Eckstein, L., Hurley, A.W. & Schwarz A. (2018), "Remembering German-Australian Colonial Entanglement: An Introduction", Postcolonial Studies, Vol.21, No.1, (January 2018), pp.1-5. 
 Dr. Charles Stargard Rumker at Astronomical and Meteorological Workers in New South Wales
 George F. J. Bergman, 'Rümker, Christian Carl Ludwig (1788 - 1862)', Australian Dictionary of Biography, Volume 2, MUP, 1967, pp 403–404
 

1788 births
1862 deaths
People from Burg Stargard
19th-century German astronomers
People from Mecklenburg-Strelitz
Recipients of the Gold Medal of the Royal Astronomical Society
Foreign Members of the Royal Society
Recipients of the Lalande Prize